Overseas ( is one of the 21 constituencies represented in the Senate of the Republic, the upper house of the Italian parliament. With more than 5.8 million registered voters is the largest constituency by population, but it currently elects only 4 Senators.

The constituency was established by the constitutional law n. 1 on 2000.

Members of the Parliament

Legislature XVIII (2018–present)

See also
 Overseas constituencies of the Italian Parliament
 Overseas (Chamber of Deputies constituency)

References

Senate constituencies in Italy
2000 establishments in Italy
Constituencies established in 2000
Expatriate voting